Oxypappus is a genus of flowering plants in the tribe Tageteae within the family Asteraceae.

The only known species is Oxypappus scaber, native to western Mexico from Sinaloa to Oaxaca.

formerly included
Oxypappus seemannii (Sch.Bip.) Blake - Pectis bonplandiana Kunth

References

Monotypic Asteraceae genera
Tageteae
Endemic flora of Mexico